The Pierre Avoi is a mountain of the Swiss Pennine Alps, overlooking Saxon in the canton of Valais. It is located on the chain between the main Rhone valley and the valley of Bagnes.

The closest locality is Verbier, from where several trails lead to the summit of Pierre Avoi.

References

External links
 Pierre Avoi on Hikr

Mountains of the Alps
Mountains of Switzerland
Mountains of Valais
Two-thousanders of Switzerland